New Castle Historic District is a national historic district located at New Castle in Craig County, Virginia, United States. It encompasses 111 contributing buildings, 2 contributing sites, and 1 contributing object in the central business district and surrounding residential areas of New Castle. The focal point of the district is the Craig County Courthouse. It was built about 1850, and is a temple-form structure with shallow gable roof, a two-story tetrastyle Greek Doric order portico and wooden hexagonal cupola. Associated with the courthouse is the sheriff's house and old jail. Other notable buildings include the Central Hotel, First National Bank Building, Layman Insurance Agency building, Givens-McCartney House (1837), Caldwell-Berger-Lamb House (c. 1852), Bank of New Castle (c. 1900), Farmers and Merchants (F&M) Bank of Craig County (1917-1920), Wagener Brothers Store (c. 1890), Bill Caldwell General Store, George W. Craft (c. 1890), New Castle Methodist Episcopal Church (c. 1893), and Masonic Temple (1940).

It was listed on the National Register of Historic Places in 1973, with a boundary increase in 1993.  The original district comprised just five buildings — the courthouse and adjacent sheriff's residence, Layman Insurance, First National Bank, and the Central Hotel — while the expanded district includes 106 additional buildings, as well as two sites and an object.

References

Historic districts on the National Register of Historic Places in Virginia
Buildings and structures in Craig County, Virginia
National Register of Historic Places in Craig County, Virginia